The Cancer Empire is the second major label release by Swedish metal band Zonaria and the first to be released on their new label, Century Media Records.  It was recorded at Studio Fredman with Fredrik Nordström. Commented singer Simon Berglund:

Track listing
"Slaughter Is Passion" - 4:14
"Praise the Eradication" - 4:05
"Crowning King Cancer" - 5:46
"Contra Mundum" - 4:37
"Termination Process" - 3:32
"At War with the Inferior" - 3:21
"From the Abysmal Womb" - 5:26
"Damnation Dressed in Flesh" - 4:01
"Humanity vs. Sanity" 4:15
"The Icon and the Faceless" 5:55
"Mad World (''Tears for Fears cover)" - 03:48 (Digital US bonus track)

Credits
Simon Berglund - Vocals/Guitar
Emil Nyström - Guitar
Markus Åkebo - Bass
Emanuel "Cebbe" Isaksson - Drums
Mastered by Peter In De Betou at Tailor Maid
Artwork by Pär Olofsson

References

External links
 

2008 albums
Zonaria albums
Albums with cover art by Pär Olofsson
Albums produced by Fredrik Nordström